Stefan Defregger (born January 31, 1993) is a former American soccer player.

Career

College and Amateur
Defregger played college soccer at Dartmouth College between 2011 and 2014.

Professional
Defregger signed with USL side Wilmington Hammerheads on March 24, 2015. He made his professional debut on March 28, 2015 as a 75th-minute substitute during a 2-2 draw against Richmond Kickers.

References

External links
 Dartmouth profile

1993 births
Living people
People from Gilford, New Hampshire
American soccer players
Dartmouth Big Green men's soccer players
Wilmington Hammerheads FC players
Rochester New York FC players
USL Championship players
Soccer players from New Hampshire
Association football midfielders